José Luis Chunga Vega (born 11 July 1991) is a Colombian professional footballer who plays as a goalkeeper for Categoría Primera A club Alianza Petrolera and the Colombia national football team.

Club career 
His beginnings in football were in Barranquilla F.C., Atlético Junior's subsidiary team in the First B Category, being part of the payroll in the 2009 1 and 2010 seasons, 2 in which he debuted as a professional.

His good performances in Primera B 2010 allowed him to be promoted to the professional Junior roster since 2011, in which he has won 2 league titles, 2 cup championships, 1 Copa Sudamericana subtitle and 2 Super Leagues.

International career
Chunga made his debut for the Colombia national team on 16 January 2022 in a 2–1 home win over Honduras.

Career statistics

1 Includes Categoría Primera A matches only.  2 Includes Copa Colombia matches only.  3 Includes U-20 Copa Libertadores and Copa Libertadores matches.

References

1991 births
Living people
Colombian footballers
Association football goalkeepers
Atlético Junior footballers
Jaguares de Córdoba footballers
Categoría Primera A players
Footballers from Barranquilla